The following highways are numbered 193:

Ireland
 R193 regional road

Japan
 Japan National Route 193

United States
 Interstate 193 (former)
 U.S. Route 193 (unbuilt)
 Alabama State Route 193
 Arkansas Highway 193
 California State Route 193
 Connecticut Route 193
 Florida State Road 193 (former)
 Georgia State Route 193
 Iowa Highway 193 (former)
 K-193 (Kansas highway)
 Kentucky Route 193
 Maine State Route 193
 Maryland Route 193
 Massachusetts Route 193
 M-193 (Michigan highway) (former)
 New Mexico State Road 193
 New York State Route 193
 Ohio State Route 193
 Pennsylvania Route 193 (former)
 South Carolina Highway 193
 Tennessee State Route 193
 Texas State Highway 193
 Texas State Highway Loop 193
 Farm to Market Road 193 (Texas)
 Utah State Route 193
 Virginia State Route 193
 Washington State Route 193
 West Virginia Route 193
 Wisconsin Highway 193
 Wyoming Highway 193
Territories
 Puerto Rico Highway 193